Greatest Hits Radio Bucks, Beds and Herts (formerly Mix 96) is a classic hits radio station, owned and operated by Bauer. It is part of the Greatest Hits Radio network.

It was formerly known as Mix 96 prior to a rebrand by Bauer in 2020.

History 

Mix 96 launched on 15 April 1994 broadcasting on 96.2FM, it was the first radio station to gain a permanent licence to serve Aylesbury and the surrounding towns including Thame, Princes Risborough, Tring and Leighton Buzzard. The launch slogan was 'Bucks Best Music' but the station now uses the strapline "Bucks Best Mix of Music". The first song to be played on the radio station was 'Dancing Queen' by ABBA, played at 7:45am on the opening morning, 15 April 1994.

Originally an independent, it was solely owned by local group Bucks Broadcasting Ltd. The original Chairman of Mix 96 was Richard Morris-Adams, Managing Director was Mark Flanagan, Sales Director was Erika Sorby-Firth and the Programme Controller was Keri Jones. In 1995 Erika Sorby-Firth took on the role of MD until Bucks Broadcasting was divested to Radio Investments in 2001. The current Managing Director is Max Hailey who returned to the radio station in 2013.

The group invested in a number of stations throughout the UK including The Bear 102, in Stratford-upon-Avon, 107.7 The Wolf in Wolverhampton, Arrow FM in Hastings and Surf 107 in Brighton.

Fox FM increased their shareholding in Bucks Broadcasting, and were themselves wholly acquired by Capital Radio plc, leading the company to become part of Capital until they were divested to Radio Investments (later known as The Local Radio Company).

The latest audience listening figures show that Mix 96 has a weekly reach of 34% (42,800).

It celebrated its 20th birthday on 15 April 2014.

On 27 May 2020 it was announced that Mix 96 would be closed and rebranded to Greatest Hits Radio from early September 2020.

A Facebook group and online petition to save Mix 96 was created by loyal listeners which even got raised as a talking point in the Houses Of Parliament.

On 1 February 2021 the previous presenters formed a new online radio station Bucks Radio which reverted to the previous mix of old and new songs with local news, weather and travel.

Present format 
Its playlist is a now a syndicated feed from Greatest Hits Radio playing music from the 70’s, 80’s and 90’s. The previous format of Mix 96 had played a mixture of old classics and new music.

References

External links 
 
 

 https://www.bucksherald.co.uk/news/people/mix-96-become-greatest-hits-radio-merger-which-puts-local-jobs-risk-2867000
 https://www.bucksfreepress.co.uk/news/19058220.bucks-radio-launches-replacement-mix-96/

Radio stations in Buckinghamshire
Aylesbury
Radio stations established in 1994
1994 establishments in England
Bauer Radio